Exiles, in comics, may refer to:

Exiles (Malibu Comics), one of two series published in 1993 and 1995 by Malibu Comics
Exiles (Marvel Comics), a Marvel Comics superhero team
Exiles (comic book), a series published by Marvel Comics starting in 2001

See also
Exile (disambiguation)